The Piscataway Township Schools is a community public school district that serves students in pre-kindergarten through twelfth grade from Piscataway, in Middlesex County, New Jersey, United States. In addition to its high school, there are four schools for K-3, two intermediate schools serving grades 4-5 and three middle schools for students in grades 6-8.

As of the 2018–19 school year, the district, comprised of 10 schools, had an enrollment of 7,161 students and 530.1 classroom teachers (on an FTE basis), for a student–teacher ratio of 13.5:1.

The district is classified by the New Jersey Department of Education as being in District Factor Group "GH", the third-highest of eight groupings. District Factor Groups organize districts statewide to allow comparison by common socioeconomic characteristics of the local districts. From lowest socioeconomic status to highest, the categories are A, B, CD, DE, FG, GH, I and J.

Awards and recognition
For the 1999-2000 school year, Conackamack Middle School received the National Blue Ribbon Award of Excellence from the United States Department of Education, the highest honor that an American school can achieve.

The district was selected as one of the top "100 Best Communities for Music Education in America 2005" by the American Music Conference.

NAMM named the district in its 2009 survey of the "Best Communities for Music Education", which included 124 school districts nationwide.

Piscataway High School was recognized by Governor Jim McGreevey in 2003 as one of 25 schools selected statewide for the First Annual Governor's School of Excellence award.

Schools
Schools in the district (with 2018–19 enrollment data from the National Center for Education Statistics) are:

Elementary schools
Dwight D. Eisenhower Elementary School (506 students; in grades K-3)
Laura Heimlich, Principal
Grandview Elementary School (789; PreK-3)
William F. Baskerville Jr., Principal
Knollwood Elementary School (505; K-3)
Lisa Parker, Principal 
Randolphville Elementary School (469; K-3)
Avi Slivko, Principal
Intermediate schools
Arbor Intermediate School (585; 4-5)
Heather O’Donnell, Acting Principal
Martin Luther King Intermediate School (4-5)
C. Alex Gray, Principal
Middle schools
Conackamack Middle School (472; 6-8)
Donna DeAngelis White, Principal
Quibbletown Middle School (485; 6-8)
William Gonzalez, Principal
Theodore Schor Middle School (576; 6-8)
Richard A. Hueston, Principal
High school
Piscataway Township High School (2,267; 9-12)
Christopher Baldassano, Principal

Administration
Core members of the district's administration are:
Frank Ranelli, Superintendent
David Oliveira, Business Administrator / Board Secretary

Board of education
The district's board of education, comprised of nine members, sets policy and oversees the fiscal and educational operation of the district through its administration. As a Type II school district, the board's trustees are elected directly by voters to serve three-year terms of office on a staggered basis, with three seats up for election each year held (since 2012) as part of the November general election. The board appoints a superintendent to oversee the day-to-day operation of the district.

See also 
 New Jersey v. T. L. O.
 Piscataway School Board v. Taxman

References

External links
Piscataway Township Schools

School Data for the Piscataway Township Schools, National Center for Education Statistics

Piscataway, New Jersey
New Jersey District Factor Group GH
School districts in Middlesex County, New Jersey